Reinard may refer to:

 Reinard the Fox, a fox in medieval European literature

Ketua kelas

People with the surname Reinard
 Julian Reinard (born 1983), German footballer
 Reinard Wilson (born 1973), American football linebacker